Special Code: Assignment Lost Formula (also known as Special Code and Special Cypher) is a 1966 Italian-Spanish-French Eurospy film directed by Pino Mercanti and starring Lang Jeffries.  Set in Istanbul, it was shot almost entirely in Catalonia.

Plot

Cast 

 Lang Jeffries as Johnny Curd 
 José Greci as  Lynn 
 Helga Liné as Luana
 George Rigaud as Hoover
  Andrea Scotti as Maitre 
  Philippe Hersent  as Richard
 Janine Reynaud  as Sheena
 Umberto Raho as Vasili
  Jacques Stany  as Carl Monger
  Pietro Ceccarelli as Yang  
  Tomás Picó  as Ivan
 Ignazio Leone as Hoover's Agent
  Max Turilli  as Oberst  
  Claudio Ruffini  as Thug 
 Franco Pesce as Old Man

References

External links

1966 films
1960s spy thriller films
1960s Italian-language films
Italian spy thriller films
Spanish spy thriller films
French spy thriller films
Films directed by Pino Mercanti
Films scored by Riz Ortolani
Underwater action films
1960s French films
1960s Italian films